Zolodininae is a subfamily of darkling beetles in the family Tenebrionidae. There are at least three genera in Zolodininae.

Genera
These genera belong to the subfamily Zolodininae:
 Tanylypa Pascoe, 1869
 Zolodinus Blanchard, 1853
 † Praezolodinus Bao, 2020

References

Further reading

 
 

Tenebrionoidea